William Harness (born May 31, 1980), professionally known as Struggle Jennings, is an American rapper from Nashville, Tennessee. He is the grandson of instrumental rock guitarist Duane Eddy and country musician Jessi Colter, the step-grandson of Waylon Jennings, and the nephew of Shooter Jennings, from whom Harness adopted his stage name. Jennings was one of the original members of Yelawolf's Slumerican label roster along with Bubba Sparxxx.

Career 
Harness was incarcerated on drug-related charges in 2011. In 2013 he appeared on Yelawolf's mixtape Wyte Dawg and released his nine-track album I Am Struggle. After being released from prison in 2016, Harness released Return of the Outlaw EP via Slumerican. From 2017 to 2018, he collaborated with longtime friend and rapper JellyRoll on a trilogy of Waylon & Willie albums, the title of which pays homage to Waylon Jennings and Willie Nelson. Struggle and his mother, Jenni Eddy Jennings, created their Spiritual Warfare EP towards the end of 2018. On January 15, 2019, Struggle and his oldest daughter, singer Brianna Harness, released a collaborative EP entitled Sunny Days which snagged the #3 spot on  Billboard Blues Albums charts. In February 2019, he also released his first solo studio album since 2011 via his own label called "Angels & Outlaws" formed that same year.

The LP titled The Widow's Son included guest appearances by Bubba Sparxxx, Jeremy Penick, Julie Roberts, Alexander King and Yelawolf.

On November 15, 2019, Jennings released the full-length album entitled Angels & Outlaws featuring 11 tracks in collaboration with his guitarist Trap DeVille and his daughter and music newcomer, Brianna Harness. The album peaked at #8 on iTunes Alternative charts.

In June 2020, Jennings teamed up with Adam Calhoun for the EP "Legends" and in December 2020, fans were surprised by the long anticipated release of "Waylon & Willie IV", the fourth record in the collaboration series between Struggle and his fellow Nashville native, Jelly Roll. On April 9, 2021, Jennings released a solo LP entitled "Troubadour of Troubled Souls" and on April 30, 2021, he released a second collaboration LP with Illinois rapper Adam Calhoun, entitled "Outlaw Shit" which gained notoriety through iTunes Rap Charts by claiming the #1 spot on release day. In 2021, Jennings can be found touring and working with artists Brianna Harness and Caitlynne Curtis to advance their independent careers via his label "Angels & Outlaws" based in Nashville.

In September 2021, Jennings and heavy metal vocalist Tommy Vext announced a co-headlining tour "The God Bless the Outlaws" across the United States. The tour was known as the first tour in the US to not require proof of COVID-19 vaccine or face mask requirements.

Discography

Studio albums

Extended plays

Certified songs

Guest appearances

References 

Living people
Country rap musicians
Musicians from Nashville, Tennessee
1980 births